Goce Delčev Square is the main public square in the town of Strumica, situated in the southeastern part of North Macedonia. It is one of the biggest city squares in the country with a total area of 23,485 square metres. It is named after the revolutionary Goce Delčev, who has a monument on the square, built in the 1970s. The square was reconstructed in 2010 and is split on two floors. The first level is an underground road junction with a parking lot, while the second floor is an open pedestrian space filled with statues, buildings and decorative equipment. Before the reconstruction the square had only a small area focused on Delčev's monument.

A copper star was placed in the center of the open space in honor of the Macedonian footballer Goran Pandev, who in 2010 won the titles of the Champions League and the Club World Cup in the FC Inter jersey. The star was torn off and stolen in November 2018 by unknown perpetrators.

About 3.5 million euros were spent for the reconstruction, provided by the Municipality of Strumica. The funds for the bronze casting of the monument "Strumica woman under a mask" were provided by the International Art Colony. The clock tower is a donation from the construction company Adora Engineering. The square was officially opened on December 10, 2010, the day before the patron saint's day of Strumica.

References

Squares in North Macedonia
Buildings and structures in Strumica